JRHS may refer to:
 James River High School (Buchanan, Virginia), United States
 James River High School (Chesterfield County, Virginia), United States
 Jay M. Robinson High School, Concord, North Carolina, United States
 John Rennie High School, Pointe-Claire, Quebec, Canada
 Julia Richman High School, New York City, United States

 Jesse Remington High School, Candia, New Hampshire, United States